The Artificial Theory for the Dramatic Beauty is the debut EP by Japanese metalcore band Crossfaith. It was released on 29 April 2009 through Zestone Records and Gan-Shin.

Track listing

Personnel
Crossfaith
 Kenta Koie – lead vocals
 Kazuki Takemura – guitars
 Terufumi Tamano – keyboards, programming, samples, backing vocals
 Hiroki Ikegawa – bass
 Tatsuya Amano – drums

References

2009 debut EPs
Crossfaith EPs